Fedor Alexandrovich Svechkov (born 5 April 2003) is a Russian professional ice hockey center who currently plays under contract with HC Spartak Moscow in the Kontinental Hockey League (KHL). He was drafted in the first round of the 2021 NHL Entry Draft by the Nashville Predators with the 19th selection.

Playing career
Svechkov played as a youth with hometown club, HC Lada Togliatti in the Junior Hockey League (MHL). Demonstrating a high-skill set offensively, Svechkov made his professional debut with Lada Togliatti in the 2020–21 season, in the second tier Supreme Hockey League (VHL). He contributed with 5 goals and 15 points in 38 regular season games while also splitting the season in the MHL, posting a point-per-game pace through 15 appearances.

On 10 May 2021, in order to play at the top level to continue his development, Svechkov was traded by Lada Togliatti to contending KHL club, SKA Saint Petersburg in exchange for financial compensation.

Svechkov was the sixth-rated European skater in NHL Central Scouting's pre-draft rankings and following his selection in the first-round, 19th overall, in the 2021 NHL Entry Draft by the Nashville Predators, he became the second consecutive Russian-born player selected in the first round by the Predators after the team picked fellow teammate Yaroslav Askarov at No. 11 overall in 2020.

On 31 July 2022, Svechkov was among 9 players traded by SKA Saint Petersburg to Spartak Moscow in exchange for Alexander Nikishin.

International play

 

 

Internationally, Svechkov splayed for Russia at 2021 IIHF World U18 Championships, winning a silver medal. Playing at center in the tournament, Svechkov was fourth in team scoring with 10 points through 7 contests.

Career statistics

Regular season and playoffs

International

References

External links
 

2003 births
Living people
HC Lada Togliatti players
Nashville Predators draft picks
National Hockey League first-round draft picks
Russian ice hockey centres
SKA-1946 players
SKA-Neva players
SKA Saint Petersburg players
HC Spartak Moscow players
Sportspeople from Tolyatti